Diplodoselachidae is a family of extinct xenacanthid sharks that ranged from the Permian to mid Triassic.

References 

Prehistoric sharks
Prehistoric cartilaginous fish families